Joan M. Jensen (born December 9, 1934 St. Paul, Minnesota) is an American historian.

Life
She attended Pasadena City College, and earned a master's degree and a Ph.D at the University of California at Los Angeles.

From 1962 to 1971, she taught at U.S. International University, in San Diego, California.
She left her job to join a farming commune in southern Colorado.
From 1974 to 1975, she taught at Arizona State University, and from 1975 to 1976 she taught at UCLA.

She taught history at New Mexico State University. 1976–1993 and holds the rank of Professor Emerita. Jensen is largely responsible for founding the University's Women's Studies Program.

In 1990 the Coalition for Western Women's History honored Jensen by creating the Joan Jensen – Darlis Miller Prize for the best scholarly article published in the preceding year in the field of women and gender in the trans-Mississippi West.

Awards
 2007 Merle Curti Award Honorable Mention for Calling This Place Home: Women on the Wisconsin Frontier, 1850–1925 (Minnesota Historical Society Press)
 1993 New Mexico Endowment for the Humanities Award for Excellence in the Humanities.
 Western Association of Women Historians Sierra Prize, for Loosening the Bonds: Mid-Atlantic Farm Women, 1750–1850
 Old Sturbridge Village Research Library Society-E. Harold Hugo Memorial Book Prize, for Loosening the Bonds: Mid-Atlantic Farm Women, 1750–1850
 New Mexico Presswomen’s Zia Award and the Governor’s Award for Historic Preservation, for New Mexico Women: Intercultural Perspectives

Works
 
 
 
 
 
 
 
 
 
 
 
 
 
 
 
  Agricultural History Society: National Conference on American Rural and Farm Women in Historical Perspective.

References

External links
 Joan Jensen Asian Indian immigrant research materials MSS 585. Special Collections & Archives, UC San Diego Library.
 

1934 births
21st-century American historians
New Mexico State University faculty
University of California, Los Angeles alumni
Alliant International University faculty
Arizona State University faculty
University of California, Los Angeles faculty
Living people
American women historians
21st-century American women writers
Historians from California